Shetland Islands Council Ferries (often named SIC Ferries) is a company operating inter-island ferry services in Shetland, a subarctic archipelago off the northeast coast of Scotland. The company operates services across 10 of the Shetland islands.

Services

Services of the SIC Ferries are:
Bluemull service linking the North Isles at Gutcher, Yell; Belmont, Unst; and Hamars Ness, Fetlar.
Bressay service to the isle of Bressay from Lerwick on the Mainland.
Fair Isle service to the isle of Fair Isle from Grutness or Lerwick on the Mainland.
Foula service to the isle of Foula from Walls on the Mainland. This service is operated by BK Marine
Out Skerries service to the isle of Out Skerries from Vidlin, Symbister (on Whalsay) or Lerwick on the Mainland
Papa Stour to the isle of Papa Stour from West Burrafirth on the Mainland.
Whalsay service to the isle of Whalsay from Laxo on the Mainland.
Yell service to the North Isle of Yell from Toft on the Mainland.

Fleet
Fleet of the SIC Ferries are:
They can carry 16 cars or 12 cars respectively as well as 95 passengers, and are used on the Bluemull service.
 was built by Ferguson Marine, Port Glasgow. She can carry 125 passengers and 19 cars and is used on the Bressay service.
MV Good Shepherd IV was built by Millers, St Monans. She can carry 12 passengers and 2 cars (craned on) and is used on the Fair Isle service.
 was built by Northern Shipbuilders in Gdańsk. She can carry 30 passengers and 9 cars and is used on the Out Skerries service. 
 was built by Simek AS, Flekkefjord. She can carry 12 passengers and 6 cars and is used on the Papa Stour service.
They can carry 12 cars or 16 cars respectively as well as 95 passengers, and are used on the Whalsay service.
They can both carry 145 passengers and 31 cars and are used on the Yell service.
 was built by Ferguson Marine, Port Glasgow. She can carry 95 passengers and 12 cars and is used as a standby vessel.

 is operated by BK Marine on behalf of SIC Ferries on the Foula service. She can carry 1 car (craned onboard) and 12 passengers.

References

External links
 SIC Ferries Official Site

Ferry companies of Scotland
Transport in Shetland
Companies owned by municipalities of Scotland
Companies based in Shetland